The   is another name for the Chūkyō Metropolitan Area and the surrounding prefectures, which have strong economic links to it. This industrial region includes the Aichi, Gifu, and Mie prefectures.

One of the dominant companies of the region is the Toyota Motor Corporation. The biggest event of recent times was the successful Expo 2005, which is expected to give a longer-lasting impulse to economic growth. The new Chubu Centrair International Airport, opened the same year, is also expected to boost the regional economy.

Industries

Aichi Prefecture
 Toyota Motor Corporation
 Toho Gas
 Chubu Electric Power Company
 Denso
 Toyota Tsusho
 Mizkan

Gifu Prefecture
 Ibiden

Mie Prefecture

See also
The city of Nagoya
Nagoya University
Meijo University
Nanzan University
Aichi University
Chūkyō Metropolitan Area
Chūkyō Television Broadcasting
Chukyo University
Industrial region

References

Chūbu region
Geography of Aichi Prefecture
Geography of Gifu Prefecture
Geography of Mie Prefecture